The music of In the Groove includes 136 songs for arcade and home releases. A few additional songs were confirmed to be present in the now-cancelled In the Groove 3. Some artists are common to Dance Dance Revolution. In fact, a few song revivals can be found in In the Groove, but with different stepcharts.

Lists of songs
An easier Novice difficulty offers charts at level 1 for all songs in both games. This difficulty is exclusive to Single and 2 Player modes. It is comparable to Beginner from Dance Dance Revolution, although Beginner is occasionally higher than level 1.

Note the numbers given for each difficulty level are similar to DDR's 1-10 "footers", except In The Groove removed the "footer" label and added 3 additional difficulty levels, which aim to have harder stepcharts than the hardest 10-footer songs in DDR. Therefore, a 10-footer in ITG is comparable to a 10-footer in DDR. If one actually counts the number of boxes showing the difficulty, one will notice there are only 12 boxes. Songs with 13-footer difficulty levels are extremely hard songs for advanced players of In The Groove. Only one 13-footer song exists for In The Groove 1, while two other songs of this difficulty level are included in the sequel.

Songs from In The Groove 1 and In The Groove 2 by Kyle A. Ward (which include ones by his stage names Smiley (☺), Inspector K, Kbit, and Banzai) can be found on his studio album Synthsations which is available for digital download. Songs from In The Groove 3 by him can be found on his other studio album Urban Comatose, also available as a digital download, with the exception of Frozen Fire, released on his earlier Synthsations album.

In The Groove
This list covers the 72 songs available in both the arcade and home versions of In The Groove, plus the four In The Groove 2 previews available in the PlayStation 2, PC and Mac OS X versions of In The Groove. All 76 songs are also available in the arcade sequel, In The Groove 2.

In The Groove for PC and Mac require the Song Pack A expansion pack to unlock the Expert difficulty on some charts.

In the arcade version of In The Groove, this song can only be played in the Energy course in the Marathon game mode. It is an unlockable song in the home version of In The Groove (it can be played as a regular song when unlocked and isn't exclusive to the Energy course) and is fully playable in the sequel In The Groove 2. It is also used as the game mode selection, song group selection, marathon mode course selection, and option menu music in the home version of the first In The Groove game in the series. It is used as the warning screen music in the PC/Mac version of In The Groove 2. However, in these parts of the game, the song has been clipped.

Unlockables

In The Groove 2
This list covers the 60 songs that are new to the arcade and home versions of In The Groove 2. The home version was only released on PC and Mac, and requires the installation of Song Pack A. Additionally, 29 of the songs from In The Groove 2 can be played in StepManiaX.

References

External links
r21freak - a custom songs community
Groovestats - ITG score-tracking website
Simfile Forums Misc

In the Groove (video game series)